The Custom House was a large brick and limestone building located at present day Wellington Quay in Dublin, Ireland which operated as a custom house and oversaw the functions associated with the import and export of goods into and out of Dublin from 1707 until 1791. It also served as the headquarters of the Revenue Commissioners, as a meeting place and offices for the Wide Streets Commission and was said to be Dublin's first dedicated office building. 

The building's main function was replaced by the significantly grander new Custom House downriver nearer the Irish sea in 1791.

From 1798, the structurally unsound building partially operated as a temporary barracks until around the end of the Napoleonic Wars in 1815. At the end of the eighteenth century, the original Custom House Quay was renamed Wellington Quay in honour of the Dublin born Arthur Wellesley, 1st Duke of Wellington while the quay itself was extended eastward between 1812-15.

History

Earlier custom houses 
Prior to the construction of Burgh's Custom House, various earlier trade halls and customs houses existed in Dublin with a similar purpose although Burgh's custom house was the first large-scale dedicated building to be constructed.

Notably, in 1597, an older custom house at Wood Quay within the city walls at Winetavern Street was destroyed in the Dublin gunpowder explosion. This location, known as 'the Crane of Dublin', was said to have been in use since the mid-thirteenth century.

A later building was developed by James VI and I eastward of the city walls near Essex Gate on reclaimed land around 1620 bordering Crampton Court and creating Crane Lane as a means of access to Dame Street. To facilitate the construction, James I took out a 90 year lease on a plot of land owned by one Jacob Newman. The lease stipulated that the land be used for 'the convenient loading, landing, putting aboard or on shore merchandise as should at any time thereafter be exported or imported'.

Commissioning and construction
Further land reclamation works from the River Liffey in the area from the seventeenth century onwards allowed for the eventual construction of a new Custom House in 1704-06 on what was already then known as Custom House Quay. Commissioned by chief commissioner William Conolly and constructed to designs by architect Thomas Burgh, the building was sited just downriver of Essex Bridge. It was the first to be built outside the city walls of Dublin, a significant moment, indicating a growing confidence in the political and military stability of the city.

For much of the 18th century, Essex Bridge was the most westerly bridge on the River Liffey, and the furthest point upriver to which tall-masted merchant ships could navigate.

Merchant ships arriving into Dublin had the choice whether to unload their goods onto lighters or gabbards to be transported by them further upstream, or to wait for a tide sufficient to carry the ship (often against the prevailing western wind) upriver to the congested space beside Essex Bridge at Capel Street where the number of ships already lying alongside the quay dictated the turn-around times for incoming ships. The port at Essex Bridge was regularly jammed with ships trying to enter and leave the small, shallow space, resuting in a situation whereby fewer than one in four ships arriving into the city chose to continue onwards from the mouth of Dublin Bay to Custom House Quay. The increase in the size of ships meant they were often even unable to approach the newer wharfs further down the river nearer the sea, and instead would lay at anchor in the bay a mile below Ringsend where their cargo would be transferred to shore with great difficulty and at great expense. Even then the cargo had reached only the end of a long spit of land, separated from Dublin by a mile of strand covered at high tide, and much further away by the dry land route. 

The Custom House became a focal point of commercial and leisure activity in Dublin, with visitors from Great Britain encouraged "to stay at one of the coffee-houses in Essex Street, by the Custom House" after their 10-12 hour journey across the Irish Sea from Holyhead to Ringsend.

The building was accessible via steps from Essex Bridge, and an archway leading to and from Essex Street to the south. It's principal entrances were in Temple Bar and Essex Street (exactly opposite the entrance to Crampton Court which was the most direct route to Dublin Castle). The importance of the site in the mid-eighteenth century is evidenced in John Rocque's 1756 map, An Exact Survey of the City and Suburbs of Dublin in which numerous vessels can be seen lining Custom House Quay, and the entirety of the river eastwards. Goods from merchant vessels were offloaded with cranes and processed on the quay, with warehouses built behind and adjacent to the building to store them. Shops, taverns, coffee houses, printers, publishers, theatres and brothels proliferated in the area with the increase of trade and mercantile activity.

Such was the importance of the Custom House, the Privy Council of Ireland (the institution within the Dublin Castle administration which exercised formal executive power in conjunction with the chief governor of Ireland, met for a number of years in rooms within it.

In the 1770s, the suitability of the site began to come into question, with merchants complaining of the amount of shipping traffic on the river, the shallowness of the water, the inability of larger vessels to reach the Custom House, and the presence of a large mass of hidden rock known as Standfast (or Steadfast) Dick extending from Dublin Castle to Capel Street on which smaller vessels could become stuck. As the tonnage of shipping increased over time, the navigational problems became even more pronounced. Another issue was the increasing congestion in Dublin's narrow medieval streets which made it difficult for merchants to get goods onboard at the Custom House, and to remove goods from the area to their desired location away from the river. The quays were not solidly built or properly maintained at this point, and carriages and horses caused not only congestion but also actual damage to the quays. The tides themselves also presented a variety of problems, in that high water at the bar of Dublin occurred 45 minutes before its arrival at the Custom House at spring tide, and half an hour earlier at neap tide. By the third quarter of the eighteenth century, it was understood that the buildings location was no longer fit for purpose and that a move to a new site would be sensible, although the Corporation had been dealing with the question of the location of the Custom House since at least 1744, when representations were put forward by the Earl of Harcourt to the Irish House of Commons concerning the matter. 

The building began to be used as a temporary barracks from 1798 until around the end of the Napoleonic Wars with the stationing of the Dumbarton Fencibles there. The importance of the position, may have influenced Robert Emmet in forming a plan to blow it up or seize it as part of the attempted Irish rebellion of 1803 on 23 July 1803. As part of Emmet's plan, three hundred men were to have gathered at the Custom House, with instructions to seize the gates and prevent reinforcements from getting through to relieve the other areas of the city targeted as part of the coup d'état, but the rebellion was aborted.

Custom house quay and the old port of Dublin
Remedial works continued to be carried out to maintain the operability of the site as a quay, and in the year 1774 alone, 308 tons of stones from the shoals were dredged from the river in front of the Custom House in an attempt to deepen the channel.

Building and structural deterioration
The building was 200 feet long and three storeys in height with a fourth mansard storey added in 1706-07 a few years after its initial construction. It was built with an arcaded ground floor with a rusticated granite front and the roof had a grand modillioned eaves-cornice. Historian Samuel A. Ossory Fitzpatrick described the building thus: 

 "Custom House Quay was limited to the frontage of the Custom House, the two upper storeys of which, built of brick, contained each in breadth fifteen windows. The lower storey, on a level with the quay, was an arcade of cut stone pierced with fifteen narrow arched entrances. A clock was placed in a triangular entablature, protected by projecting cornices, in the centre of the top of the north front. On a level with this, there stood on each side of the roof five elevated dormers, surmounting the windows."

In 1773 it was found that the upper floors of the building were structurally unsound which would require the construction of additional warehouses on Essex Street West. A report prepared for the Lord Lieutenant of Ireland concluded that, given the choice between repairing and refurbishing the present Custom House and building a new one for the city and port of Dublin, it would be better to build one in a new location. The council, after much deliberation and the interviewing of witnesses, concluded that "The present location is inconvenient to trade and prejudicial to His Majesty's revenue".

John Beresford, who later became first commissioner of revenue for Ireland in 1780, was pivotal in the decision to construct a newly sited Custom House downriver nearer to Dublin Bay. The plans for the new Custom House were unpopular with Dublin Corporation and the city guilds who complained that it would still leave little room for shipping and was being built on what at the time was made up of low-lying sandbanks and marshland. Temple Bar merchants and traders also voiced huge opposition to the move, as it would completely shift the economic focus of the city away to the east, and would lessen the value of their properties while making the property owners to the east wealthier. In 1781, Beresford appointed James Gandon as architect, after Thomas Cooley, the original architect on the project, had died. Construction on the new Custom House began in 1781, and was completed and opened for business on 7 November 1791.

In July 1886, while excavations were being made for the foundation of the premises of Messrs. Dollard and Company (the site of the modern day Clarence Hotel), the first course of the Custom House (possibly the arcade) was revealed, exposing "handsome" chiselled black limestone at a depth of 4 feet 6 inches from the then-level of Essex Street.

As of 2023, the site of the original building is now largely occupied by the Clarence Hotel, built in 1852, the former Dollard's printing house (1885) and the workman's club (1815).

See also
The Custom House
Custom House, Belfast
The Custom House, Cork
The Custom House, Limerick
Dick's Coffee House, a nearby coffeehouse, which was located on Skinner's Row

Notes

Sources

Government buildings in the Republic of Ireland
City and town halls in the Republic of Ireland
Buildings and structures in Dublin (city)
Demolished buildings and structures in Dublin